Syed Kamal Bakht, also known by his daak naam Saki, is a Bangladeshi politician and the former Member of Parliament of Satkhira-1.

Early life
Syed Kamal Bakht was born in 1930, to a Bengali Muslim family of Syeds in the village of Tetulia in Tala, Satkhira, Khulna District. As a part of the Muslim Student League, he took part in the Bengali language movement.

Career
Bakht successfully won a seat in the 1970 Pakistani general elections but did not become a member of the National Assembly of Pakistan due to the outbreak of the Bangladesh Liberation War. He played an important role as a freedom fighter. He was elected to parliament from Khulna-13 as an Awami League candidate following the 1973 Bangladeshi general elections. He lost this seat in the next election to M. Mansur Ali but regained it in 1986 when the constituency was renamed to Satkhira-1. He served in this second term until 1988, in which he lost it to his relative Syed Didar Bakht of the Jatiya Party. At the 1991 Bangladeshi general election, Bakht again lost, this time to Jamaat-e-Islami politician Ansar Ali. He managed to defeat Ali at the subsequent 1996 Bangladeshi general election.

Death
Syed Kamal Bakht died of old age on 15 December 2000.

References

Awami League politicians
Living people
3rd Jatiya Sangsad members
7th Jatiya Sangsad members
1st Jatiya Sangsad members
People from Satkhira District
1930 births
2000 deaths
Bangladeshi people of Arab descent